Lennox was a federal electoral district represented in the House of Commons of Canada from 1867 to 1904. It was located in the province of Ontario. It was created by the British North America Act of 1867.

The County of Lennox consisted of the Townships of Richmond, Adolphustown, North Fredericksburg, South Fredericksburg, Ernest Town, and Amherst Island, and the Village of Napanee.

The electoral district was abolished in 1903 when it was merged into Lennox and Addington.

Electoral history

|}

On Mr. Cartwright being named Minister of Finance, 7 November 1873:

|}

|}

|}

|}

On the election being declared void:

|}

On the election being declared void:
 

|}

|}

|}

On the election being declared void:
 

|}

|}

|}

See also 

 List of Canadian federal electoral districts
 Past Canadian electoral districts

External links 

Parliamentary website

Former federal electoral districts of Ontario